A la fiesta is the third single by Spanish-French eurodance band Miranda from the album Fiesta. It reached #66 on the Dutch Singles Chart.

Track listing
Ibiza Radio Edit - 3:35
London Radio Edit – 4:05
Ibiza Club Mix – 6:35
London Club Mix – 7:05

2000 singles
1999 songs
Eurodance songs
Songs written by Louis Element